Felix Otto Auböck (also spelled Auboeck, born 19 December 1996) is an Austrian swimmer. Felix is the current World Champion in the 400 metre freestyle short course as well as a three time Olympic Finalist, including a 4th Place finish at the 2020 Tokyo Olympics. Previously He competed in the men's 400 metre freestyle event at the 2016 Summer Olympics. In 2019, he competed in three events at the 2019 World Aquatics Championships held in Gwangju, South Korea.

In 2020, Auboeck swam for the New York Breakers in the International Swimming League in Budapest. Auboeck represented Austria again at the 2020 Summer Olympics in Tokyo, competing in the 400 m, 800 m and 1500 m freestyle events.

References

External links
 

1996 births
Living people
Olympic swimmers of Austria
Swimmers at the 2016 Summer Olympics
Swimmers at the 2020 Summer Olympics
People from Baden District, Austria
Michigan Wolverines men's swimmers
Austrian male freestyle swimmers
World Aquatics Championships medalists in swimming
European Aquatics Championships medalists in swimming
Austrian expatriate sportspeople in the United States
Sportspeople from Lower Austria
20th-century Austrian people
21st-century Austrian people